D'Albertis' ringtail possum (Pseudochirops albertisii) is a species of marsupial in the family Pseudocheiridae. It is found in Indonesia and Papua New Guinea. Its natural habitat is subtropical or tropical dry forests.

References

Possums
Mammals described in 1874
Taxa named by Wilhelm Peters
Taxonomy articles created by Polbot
Marsupials of New Guinea